Ape Quest (known as Sarugetchu: Piposaru Senki in Japan) is a role-playing video game spin-off from the Ape Escape series by Sony Computer Entertainment. It is a PlayStation Portable title and was released in North America and Europe exclusively on the PlayStation Store and a UMD in Japan only. It is downloadable as a free Starter Pack, with the remainder of the game available as three separate downloadable chapters.

Premise
The king of the Toqsica Kingdom sends his son with the respected knight D' Apetagnan on a pilgrimage to the seal that holds the Apetron, a group of apes that terrorized the kingdom ages ago, who also are known as the Pipotron Brothers. However, the king's son impulsively eats the banana-shaped seal, releasing the Apetron upon the land again. Now, the prince must save the land from its curse.

Gameplay
The player takes control of the prince and travels across various areas, meeting Ape Team members, fighting monsters, earning Chips (the game's currency) and carrying out quests. The player must choose from predetermined routes consisting of turns, in the way of a board game. The player traverses across these routes, but once chosen, the player cannot move or stop. On each turn, the player can open the menu, which allows the player to save, equip items and perform other actions (this can be done at the end of each route as well). Turn-based battles and minigames can also occur randomly. Battles rely on the equipment used and strength. Minigames, on the other hand, are entirely based on skill (these can deduct hit points, or "Guts", as well). The player can also visit towns and dungeons as well as members of the Ape Team.

Ape Team
The Ape Team is composed of ape warriors that the player can summon in a fight (at the cost of Chips) if the player is in a tough spot. The player can collect different members by talking to them around the area, who are all supply peddlers. After talking with them, they are added on the list of Ape Team members. Also, all Ape Team members have a relationship value, which increases when purchasing items from them.

Bosses
The game's storyline revolves around destroying various golems throughout each area. These take the form of a lion, a wolf, a snake and a crab, among others. These are in minigame form and usually involve dodging attacks until the foe moves in, then attacking.

Reception

References

External links
Profile on PlayStation.com

2008 video games
Ape Escape games
PlayStation Portable games
PlayStation Portable-only games
PlayStation Network games
Role-playing video games
Video games developed in Japan
Single-player video games
Sony Interactive Entertainment games